Herman Lindqvist (born 1863, Arboga, d. 1932) was a Swedish Social Democratic politician and trade union organizer. By profession he was a furniture carpenter, and belonged to the Swedish Wood Workers' Union. He was the chairman of the Swedish Trade Union Confederation 1900–1920.

References

Swedish Social Democratic Party politicians
Members of the Andra kammaren
1863 births
1932 deaths
Speakers of Andra kammaren